Drepanophycaceae is a family of extinct lycophytes of  Late Silurian to Late Devonian age, found in North America, China, Russia, Europe, and Australia.

Description
The stems are several mm to several cm in diameter and several cm to several metres long, erect or arched, dichotomizing occasionally, furnished with true roots at the base. Vascular bundle an exarch actinostele, tracheids of primitive annular or helical type (so-called G-type). Leaves are unbranched microphylls several mm to 2 cm or more long with a single prominent vascular thread, arranged spirally to randomly on the stem. Homosporous sporangia borne singly on the upper leaf surface or in an axillary position.

Drepanophycaceae differs from a related family of the same period, Asteroxylaceae, in having vascularized microphylls; see Drepanophycales for more details.

Genera
The genera in the family are:
Drepanophycus Göppert (type genus)
microphylls short, tapering rapidly from wide base (thorn-shaped)
microphylls arranged spirally or randomly on stem
sporangia borne on upper surface of microphylls
Baragwanathia Lang & Cookson
microphylls long, not tapering over most of length (strap-shaped)
microphylls arranged spirally on stem
sporangia borne axially (whether on microphylls or on stem is not known)

Notes

References 

Devonian plants
Silurian plants
Drepanophycales
Prehistoric plant families
Silurian first appearances
Late Devonian extinctions
Prehistoric lycophytes